Nannobrachium is a genus of lanternfishes.

Species
There are currently 17 recognized species in this genus:
 Nannobrachium achirus (Andriashev, 1962) (Lantern fish)
 Nannobrachium atrum (Tåning, 1928) (Dusky lanternfish)
 Nannobrachium bristori Zahuranic, 2000
 Nannobrachium crypticum Zahuranic, 2000
 Nannobrachium cuprarium (Tåning, 1928)
 Nannobrachium fernae (Wisner, 1971)
 Nannobrachium gibbsi Zahuranic, 2000
 Nannobrachium hawaiiensis Zahuranic, 2000
 Nannobrachium idostigma (A. E. Parr, 1931)
 Nannobrachium indicum Zahuranic, 2000
 Nannobrachium isaacsi (Wisner, 1974)
 Nannobrachium lineatum (Tåning, 1928)
 Nannobrachium nigrum Günther, 1887 (Black lantern fish)
 Nannobrachium phyllisae Zahuranic, 2000
 Nannobrachium regale (C. H. Gilbert, 1892) (Pinpoint lampfish)
 Nannobrachium ritteri (C. H. Gilbert, 1915) (Broadfin lampfish)
 Nannobrachium wisneri Zahuranic, 2000

References

Myctophidae
Marine fish genera
Taxa named by Albert Günther